Fellows or Fellowes is a surname. 

Notable people with the surname include:
 Ailwyn Fellowes, 1st Baron Ailwyn (1855–1924), British businessman, farmer and politician
 Archie Fellows, English footballer
 Carol Fellowes, 4th Baron Ailwyn (1896–1988), British peer
 Charles Fellows (disambiguation)
 Charlie Fellows (disambiguation)
 Christine Fellows (born 1968), Canadian folk-pop singer-songwriter
 Daisy Fellowes (1890–1962), French socialite
 Darren Fellows (born 1975), British musician
 Deborah Copenhaver Fellows,  American sculptor
 Don Fellows (1922–2007), American actor
 Edmund Fellowes (E.H. Fellowes) (1870–1951), English musicologist, cleric and authority on Tudor church music
 Edwin R. Fellows (1865–1945), founder of the Fellows Gear Shaper Company
 Eric Fellowes, 3rd Baron Ailwyn (1887–1976), British peer
 Frank Fellows (basketball), American basketball coach
 Frank Fellows (politician) (1889–1951), U.S. Representative from Maine
 Gary Fellows (born 1978), English cricketer
 George Byron Lyon-Fellowes (1815–1876), Mayor of Ottawa (1876)
 Graeme Fellowes (1934–2013), Australian rules footballer
 Graham Fellows (born 1959), English comic actor
 Grant Fellows (1865-1929), American jurist
 Harvey Fellows (1826–1907), English cricketer
 James Fellowes (cricketer) (1841–1916), English cricketer
 James Fellowes (lord lieutenant) (1849–1935), English lord lieutenant
 James Fellowes (physician) (1771–1857), English physician
 Jane Fellowes, Baroness Fellowes (born 1957), older sister of Diana, Princess of Wales
 Jonathan Fellows-Smith (born 1932), former South African cricketer
 John R. Fellows (1832–1896), U.S. Representative from New York
 Julian Fellowes (born 1949), English actor, novelist and screenwriter
 Michael Fellows (born 1952), American academic
 Mike Fellows (musician) (born 1965), American musician
 Newton Fellowes (1772–1854), English politician
 Robert Fellowes, Baron Fellowes (born 1941), Private Secretary to Queen Elizabeth II (1990–1999); brother-in-law of Diana, Princess of Wales
 Robert Fellows (1903–1969), American film producer
 Ron Fellows (born 1959), Canadian racing car driver
 Scott Fellows (born 1965), American television writer and producer
 Stephen Fellows English songwriter
Stewart Fellows (born 1948), English professional footballer
 Thomas Fellowes (1778-1853), Royal Navy officer during the Napoleonic Wars
 Thomas Hounsom Butler Fellowes (1827–1923), a Royal Navy officer during the Victorian era.
 Walter Fellows (1834–1901), English cricketer
 Warren Fellows (born 1952), Australian convicted of drug trafficking in 1981
 Wes Fellowes (born 1961), Australian Rules Footballer
 William Fellowes, 2nd Baron de Ramsey (1848–1925), British Conservative politician
 William Henry Fellowes (1769–1837), British M.P.

English-language surnames